The British Rail Class 810 Aurora is a type of bi-mode multiple unit being constructed by Hitachi Rail for East Midlands Railway. Based on the Hitachi AT300 design, 33 five-car units are being built to replace Class 180 and Class 222 units on EMR's intercity routes.

Background
In July 2012, it was announced by Network Rail that the Midland Main Line (MML) would be electrified north of Bedford, allowing the diesel trains currently used on the route by to be replaced with new electric trains.
However, electrification was paused by Network Rail in June 2015, and then cancelled in July 2017 by then-Secretary of State for Transport Chris Grayling, who made the decision to use bi-mode trains on the MML instead.

In August 2019, East Midlands Railway placed a £400million order for 33 five-car bi-mode units which will be deployed on services on the MML, replacing its Class 180 and 222 fleets. The order is being funded by Rock Rail East Midlands. It was originally planned that the new trains would enter service before December 2022, but as a result of the COVID-19 pandemic the introduction was delayed into 2023. In February 2023 it was reported that Class 810 is now expected to enter service in 2024.

In October 2020, EMR announced they would be branded as Aurora following a public competition.

Design
The Class 810 is an evolution of the Class 802 units Hitachi have delivered to a number of British train operators. The major change is a  reduction in the length of each vehicle, which is required in order to allow paired (ten-car) Class 810 trains to use London St Pancras station. Some of the length reduction has been achieved by reprofiling the front end of the train and shortening the nosecone.

Both of these changes are intended to satisfy the franchise requirement that the new trains equal or exceed the performance of the current Class 222 units. The power packs will be installed under the first, second, fourth, and fifth vehicles, while the third (centre) vehicle will carry the high-voltage transformer. Traction motors will be fitted to the bogies of the second and fourth vehicles.

Interior
In response to customer feedback regarding seating comfort on earlier Class 80x units, both first- and standard-class seats on the Class 810 will be of a unique design that is intended to offer enhanced comfort. They will be based on the existing FISA Lean design, but of an altered appearance. EMR were working closely with Derby-based design company DGDESIGN on the design of the new interiors. It is claimed that the seats will have wider cushions, more-sculpted headrests, softer and deeper armrests, additional privacy screening, and be upholstered in a wool-rich moquette that is intended to be easier to keep clean. Every passenger will have access to power sockets and USB charging points, at-seat coat hooks, and storage space under each seat. EMR intend the seats to be the most comfortable on the network when they are introduced.

Fleet details

References

High-speed trains of the United Kingdom
Hitachi multiple units
Hybrid multiple units
25 kV AC multiple units
Train-related introductions in 2024